Abdullah Sabt Ghulam (born 2 January 1975) is an Emirati hurdler. He competed in the men's 400 metres hurdles at the 1992 Summer Olympics.

References

1975 births
Living people
Athletes (track and field) at the 1992 Summer Olympics
Emirati male hurdlers
Olympic athletes of the United Arab Emirates
Place of birth missing (living people)
Athletes (track and field) at the 1998 Asian Games
Asian Games competitors for the United Arab Emirates